The Klang District is a district in Selangor, Malaysia. It is located in the western part of Selangor. It borders the Kuala Selangor District to the north, Petaling to the east, Kuala Langat district to the south and Malacca Straits to the west. The district was further divided into two mukims which is Klang and Kapar that covers 626.78 square km of land with 53.75 km of coastline.

The district's principal town is Klang City. Other towns in the district include Port Klang, Pandamaran, Kapar and Meru and Bandar Sultan Sulaiman.

The Klang River flows through the Klang district and end near Port Klang and it has many islands such as Klang, Indah, Chet Mat Zin, Ketam, Tengah, Rusa, Selat Kering and Pintu Gedong Island.

Administrative divisions

Klang District is divided into 2 mukims, which are Kapar and Klang: Kapar is the areas north of Klang River (Kapar itself is also the name of a town), while Klang covers the area south of the river. Klang city itself includes areas both north and south of the river.

Kapar (Klang Utara)

KU 1 - City Centre, Bandar Baru Klang
KU 2 - Bandar Bukit Raja east
KU 3 - Batu Belah 
KU 4 - Rantau Panjang 
KU 5 - Bandar Bukit Raja west / Aman Perdana
KU 6 - Taman Klang Utama
KU 7 - Sungai Kapar Indah
KU 8 - Meru south
KU 9 - Taman Perindustrian Meru

KU 10 - Meru north
KU 11 – Kampung Bukit Kapar
KU 12 - Acob
KU 13 - Kapar
KU 14 - Sungai Serdang
KU 15 - Perepat
KU 16 - Sementa
KU 17 - Bandar Sultan Suleiman 
KU 18 - Northport

Klang (Klang Selatan)

KS 1 – Teluk Pulai
KS 2 - Taman Sri Andalas
KS 3 - Sungai Udang
KS 4 - Port Klang 
KS 5 - Pandamaran
KS 6 - Bandar Bukit Tinggi
KS 7 - Taman Sentosa

KS 8 - Johan Setia
KS 9 - Bandar Parklands 
KS 10 – Teluk Gong
KS 11 – Bandar Armada Putra
KS 12 - Westport / Port Klang Free Zone
KS 13 - Kampung Sungai Pinang (Indah Island)
Selat Klang - Ketam Island

History
In addition to its present-day territory, Klang district before 1974 also included the mukims (communes or sub-districts) of Bukit Raja and Damansara, which covered what is today Shah Alam, Subang Jaya, Bandar Sunway and Kelana Jaya. In 1974, after Kuala Lumpur was made a Federal Territory, the subdistricts of Damansara and Bukit Raja joined with Petaling Jaya, Puchong and Sungai Buloh to form the Petaling District.

Demographics
In 1980, the census figures for the 3 main ethnic groups in the Klang District were: Malays 105,195, Chinese 119,186, and Indians 54,159.
The following are the 2010 census figures for Klang District, which include the city of Klang, Port Klang and part of Shah Alam.

Federal Parliament and State Assembly Seats 

List of Klang district representatives in the Federal Parliament (Dewan Rakyat)

List of Klang district representatives in the State Legislative Assembly of Selangor

See also

 Districts of Malaysia

References